Oreodera brailovskyi is a species of beetle in the family Cerambycidae. It was described by Chemsak and Noguera in 1993.

Oreodera brailovskyi is the scientific name of a group of Lamiinae -also called lamiines or flat-faced longhorned beetles

References

Oreodera
Beetles described in 1993